Elmgrove, Ontario may refer to:

Elmgrove, Lanark County, Ontario
Elmgrove, Simcoe County, Ontario